Bomba may refer to:

Places
Bomba, Belize, a village in the Belize District of Belize.
Bomba, Abruzzo, a comune in Province of Chieti, Italy.
Bomba, Libya, a village near the city of Derna in Libya.
Gulf of Bomba, a body of water in the Mediterranean Sea on the northern coast of Libya.
Lago di Bomba, a lake in Province of Chieti, Abbruzzo Region, Italy.

Music
Bomba (Ecuador), a musical style of Ecuador.
Bomba (Puerto Rico), a musical style of Puerto Rico.
Bomba (band), an Australian band.
 Bomba (song), 2017 single by Aggro Santos.
"Bomba", 2007 song by Edo Maajka.

People
Bomba (surname)
Bomba (tribe), a tribe of Azad Kashmir, Pakistan
Bomba Jawara, Sierra Leonean politician
Ferdinand II of the Two Sicilies, called re bomba ("King Bomb")

Other uses
Bomba (cryptography), the Polish device for breaking the Enigma cryptographic machine
Bomba (genre), a Filipino film genre
Bomba rice, a Spanish variety of rice
Bomba, the Jungle Boy, a series of books by Roy Rockwood that later became a film series
 Bomba, the Jungle Boy (film), a 1949 American film about Bomba, the Jungle Boy
Malaysian Fire and Rescue Department or Bomba
Bombilla, also known as bomba, a drinking straw used for drinking mate.

See also 
 Bamba (disambiguation)
 Bomb (disambiguation)
 Bombe (disambiguation)
 Bombo (disambiguation).
 Ferdinand II of the Two Sicilies (1810–1859), nicknamed "King Bomba"
 La Bomba (disambiguation)
 Tsar Bomba, the popular name for the Soviet RDS-220 (in Cyrillic: РДС-220) hydrogen bomb, the most powerful nuclear weapon ever detonated.